Events from the year 1689 in art.

Events
 King William III of England commissions the Cartoon Gallery at Hampton Court Palace from Sir Christopher Wren to house Raphael's drawings of the Acts of the Apostles.
 John Riley is appointed court painter to William III and Mary II in England.

Paintings

 Meindert Hobbema – The Avenue at Middelharnis
 Godfrey Kneller – Portrait of Isaac Newton

Births
 July – Szymon Czechowicz, Polish painter (died 1775)
 November 24 – Frans van Mieris jr., Dutch painter (died 1763)
 date unknown
 Jiao Bingzhen, Chinese painter of the Qing dynasty (died 1726)
 Giovanni Casini, Italian portrait painter as well as a sculptor (died 1748)
 Gaspare Diziani, Italian painter of the late-Baroque or Roccoco period (died 1767)
 Ferdinando Porta, Italian painter and engraver (died 1767)
 Franz de Paula Ferg, Austrian landscape painter (died 1740)
 Agostino Veracini, Italian painter and engraver (died 1762)
 Johann Salomon Wahl, German painter who became court painter in Denmark (died 1765)

Deaths
 January 6 – Baldassare Franceschini, Italian painter of frescoes (born 1611)
 June 10 – Christophe Veyrier, French sculptor (born 1637)
 June 21 – Thomas Blanchet, French painter, draughtsman, architect, sculptor and printmaker (born 1614)
 August 9 – Dionisio Lazzari, Italian sculptor and architect (born 1617)
 September 13 – Ciro Ferri, Italian Baroque sculptor and painter (born 1634)
 November 3 – Fyodor Zubov, Russian painter, engraver, miniaturist and illuminator (born 1615)
 November 12 – Justus de Verwer, Dutch painter and illustrator (born 1625)
 November 16 – Cornelis Mahu, Flemish painter (born 1613)
 date unknown
 Alexander Coosemans, Flemish Baroque still-life painter (born 1627)
 Fabio Cristofari, Italian Baroque painter and mosaicist (born unknown)
 Gioseffo Danedi, Italian painter (born 1618)
 Charles Errard, French painter, architect and engraver (born 1606)
 Gong Xian, Chinese painter (born 1618)
 William Lodge, English engraver and printmaker (born 1649)
 Pietro Montanini, Italian painter (born 1619)
 Cristoforo Serra, Italian painter who was also a militia captain in the Papal troops (born 1600)

 
Years of the 17th century in art
1680s in art